Can't Keep a Secret (stylized can'T keEp A SecrEt) is the second album by Canadian pop punk band Faber Drive. The first single released from this album was "G-Get Up and Dance". It reached number six on the Canadian Hot 100 chart. Its second single, "Give Him Up", was released on November 30, 2009, and peaked at number 26 on the Canadian Hot 100. Its third single, "You and I Tonight", peaked at number 49. A fourth single, "The Payoff", failed to chart.

Critical reception

AllMusic writer Matthew Chisling praised the new dance-rock approach the band took on the record but was skeptical of their ability to find their own sound and just use the most popular genres instead. He concluded that a track like the Jessie Farrell duet "I'll Be There" "suggest that just because Faber Drive are playing to the sounds of the times doesn't mean they can't produce terrific music that is always funky and fun, if not spectacularly unique." Johan Wippsson from Melodic also gave note of the use of synthesizers throughout the album, but felt that it sounds like two separate bands occupying the same record, with only half of the tracks utilizing said instrument. He concluded that "there's some nice songs here like on the debut and if you're into lightweight modern rock Can't Keep a Secret is worth checking up."

At the 2011 Juno Awards, Can't Keep a Secret was nominated as Pop Album of the Year.

Track listing

References

External links
 Can't Keep a Secret on Myspace
 Faber Drive TV on YouTube

2009 albums
Faber Drive albums
604 Records albums